The Departmental Council of Doubs is the deliberative assembly of the Doubs department in the region of Bourgogne-Franche-Comté. It consists of 38 members (general councilors) from 19 cantons and its headquarters are in Besançon.

The President of the General Council is Christine Bouquin.

Vice-Presidents 
The President of the Departmental Council is assisted by 11 vice-presidents chosen from among the departmental advisers. Each of them has a delegation of authority.

References

See also 

 Doubs
 General councils of France
 Departmental Council of Doubs (official website)

Doubs
Doubs